Blakroc (stylized as BlakRoc) is a studio album by American rock band the Black Keys, in collaboration with Damon Dash, co-founder and former co-owner of Roc-A-Fella Records, who oversaw the project. The album features guest appearances from several hip hop and R&B acts, namely Mos Def, Nicole Wray, Pharoahe Monch, Ludacris, Billy Danze of M.O.P., Q-Tip of A Tribe Called Quest, Jim Jones and NOE of ByrdGang, as well as Raekwon, RZA and Ol' Dirty Bastard of Wu-Tang Clan.

Recording and production
After Damon Dash began listening to Ohio-based rock duo the Black Keys, which he says quickly became his favorite band, he reached out to the musicians to meet in person. Dash suggested they enter the studio with his friend and associate, New York City-based rapper Jim Jones, with whom Dash had recently partnered to form Splash Records at the time. While recording with co-producer and engineer Joel Hamilton at Studio G, Brooklyn rapper Mos Def interrupted the session and ended up recording with them as well. With new artists being called in to work on the album, it was completed after eleven weeks of recording. Included in the project are vocals from deceased rapper and former Roc-A-Fella Records artist Ol' Dirty Bastard, tapes which were signed over to his brief Roc4Life venture under Def Jam, with the intention of an eventual album release. In order to release Blakroc, Dash founded an independent record label in conjunction with the band.

Release and promotion
Damon Dash, co-founder of the project has endorsed BlakRoc Camaros, limited edition Chevrolet Camaro automobiles to promote the album and brand. The Black Keys have stated they did not take part in the promotion.

Reception

The album was generally received well by critics. The album reached Number 1 and Number 7 on the US Billboard Heatseakers chart and US Billboard Top Rap Albums respectively. Nick Neyland of BBC music stated in his review "this is a surprisingly compelling and welcome rejoining of the rap and rock worlds that successfully captures the off-the-cuff nature of the recording sessions."

Blakroc 2
In early September 2011, a trailer surfaced for Blakroc 2. Later that month in an interview with Atlanta radio station 92.9 Dave FM, Black Keys drummer Patrick Carney said, "Blakroc 2 is not coming out soon... there are no plans for that." Carney said that the trailer is actually an unauthorized video that was pieced together around 2013. They recorded "about eight songs" at the time, but the album was never completed. A publicist has confirmed that there is no release date set for Blakroc 2. The trailer was posted on the YouTube channel of Damon Dash's DD172 media collective.

Track listing

"Coochie" song does not appear on versions of the album released through several digital providers.

Chart positions

References

External links
Official website

2009 albums
The Black Keys albums
Collaborative albums
Rap rock albums by American artists